The Mohaka river is on the North Island of New Zealand in the east central region of Hawke’s Bay. Mohaka is a Maori word, roughly translated it means “place for dancing”. The iwi (Māori tribes) associated with the Mohaka River are Ngāti Pāhauwera, Ngāti Hineuru, Ngāti Tūwharetoa and Mana Ahuriri. The headwaters are found in the Kaweka and Kaimanawa ranges. From the range it winds southeast before twisting northeast and finally southeast again to empty into the Pacific Ocean near the town of Mohaka. There are many gorges on the Mohaka; some as steep as 200m (656 feet). Its main tributaries are the Waipunga, Taharua, Hautapu rivers.

History
Ngati Pahauwera’s traditional tribal territory is from the Te Hoe river junction to its mouth. The river, including its waters, bed and fisheries, is a taonga of Ngati Pahauwera. In particular they place great emphasis on the role the river plays in their tribal identity.

The Mohaka was an important river for fishing and transport long before the settlers arrived. Archeological surveys have found extensive evidence of villages and temporary camps along the lower and upper Mohaka. The Maori collected Hangi stones, taupunga, opunga, poutama, kowhaturi from the riverbed.

The famous Maori, Te Kooti, reportedly frequented the area. Te Kooti’s Lookout, said to be the site of a fight with the British, is visible from the river. Later,  Europeans used the Mohaka to transport timber.
In 2004 a water conservation order was placed on the upper section of the Mohaka because of its fantastic fishing, scenic gorges and outstanding amenity for recreation. The area is also an important habitat for the rare blue duck.

More recently it is a popular spot for rafting, kayaking, tramping and fishing.

Course and Characteristics

Kaweka Forest Park

Up in the Kaweka range the Mohaka is a twisting grade II river with a bit of grade III. There are several Department of Conservation (DOC) campsites, hot pools and plenty of undisturbed native bush. After approximately 36 km, it comes out of the Kawekas and farmland becomes more common The river bends itself into an oxbow and shortly after rapids become larger as it leads into the grade III section. DOC campsites are still found along this 68 km stretch.

Everett's Camp to Te Kooti Bridge
As the more technical grade III rapids begin the river flows past native bush of the Tataraakina block on the left and Waitere Station on the right. This section contains Te Hoe’s rapid, which is the largest and longest in this section. There are 3 gorges to be appreciated on this run.

Te Kooti Bridge to Willow Flat
Te Kooti’ s bridge marks the start of the grade V and the end of the grade III. After the bridge, it is an easy grade II float for about 4 km then the banks get steeper and the rapids start off with the largest one on the river, Long Rapid. Scenery on this stretch includes massive boulders, waterfalls falling from the steep canyon walls and fascinating erosion patterns created by the water on the soft stones. The rapids are continuous for the full 18 km with the grade being mostly III+ with some exciting IV/V.

Willow Flat to Mohaka Township

The final stretch of the river after the grade V returns to grade II as it mellows and flows into the ocean. More steep walled banks of river and side creeks can be seen down this section as they cascade down, creating substantially high tiered waterfalls and smaller side gorges. The vegetation changes to become more lush, featuring silver fern or punga, eventually easing off to cleared farm land towards the ocean

Flow
Water level is usually highest in the spring, dropping naturally throughout the summer but can rise quickly in heavy rains. Slips are common and trees can sometimes be found drifting or jammed between boulders. There is an automatic river gauge which posts water level information (NIWA) or contact the local rafting companies for current conditions.

Geology
Much of the Mohaka runs through sedimentary rock. In the upper sections, greywacke commonly forms the steeper banks with smaller stones and shingle forming shallow beds and beaches. Conglomerate, sandstone and limestone begin to dominate the banks and large boulders create the rapids down through the grade III section.
Moving closer to the grade V section, the boulders become larger and the banks narrow into a deep gorge. Large conglomerate blocks form the first rapid then the river eases into a sedimentary rock canyon. The boulders, while impressive in size, are even more intriguing because of the holes and depressions the water has carved into them. House rock worth a closer look; the center has been carved out and is accessible only by a hole in the side. Fossilized shells and organic matter have been remarkably well preserved in the stones.

After the Willow Flat Bridge, the size and frequency of large boulders decreases to be replaced by steep vegetation covered terraces. Sandstone and mudstone become more prevalent as the river approaches the ocean, as does farmland.

Approximately seven fault lines cross the Mohaka river. Most are found in the upper section but the most obvious to untrained observers is found just above a rapid called Red Rock in the grade III section. It becomes apparent a fault has been crossed as the type of rock changes almost instantly.

Recreation
Commercial rafting is run on all sections of the Mohaka. Most sections can be run as a day trip or sections can be combined into multi day adventures.

The Mohaka offers something for any level of kayaking. Beginners will find plenty of eddies and waves on the grade II sections while intermediate kayakers will find the grade III more challenging. The grade V is a technical run for more advanced kayakers. Local rafting companies have the most up-to-date information and can often assist in setting up a shuttle.

The upper section is the most popular destination for fishing in Hawke’s Bay. Trout is a common catch, along with various varieties of native fish. Mainly brown trout are found above Pakaututu bridge and rainbow trout below. Fishing is not as good on the lower sections but the rapids are more exciting and challenging.

Hiking is popular along the upper section. Trails lead to the hot springs and access the river in various places along the way. They are maintained by the Department of Conservation.

Hunting for sika and red deer as well as pigs and goats is common. A permit is required.

Gallery

See also

Wētā
Blue duck
Hawke's Bay region
Rafting
Mohaka Viaduct

References

External links
  Local company-Mohaka Rafting
 Water Level

Rivers of the Hawke's Bay Region
Rafting
Tourist attractions in the Hawke's Bay Region
Ngāti Pāhauwera
Ngāti Hineuru
Ngāti Tūwharetoa
Rapids of New Zealand
Rivers of New Zealand